Patrick Harte  (26 July 1931 – 8 January 2018) was an Irish Fine Gael politician who served for 36 years as Teachta Dála (TD) for Donegal North-East.

Early life and family
He was born in 1931 in Lifford, County Donegal. His son, Jimmy Harte, is a former Labour Party Senator.

Political career
He was first elected to the 17th Dáil at the 1961 general election, and re-elected at eleven further general elections. In the 22nd Dáil, from 1981 to 1982, he was Minister of State at the Department of Posts and Telegraphs in Taoiseach Garret FitzGerald's government. In 1989 he was an unsuccessful candidate in the Connacht–Ulster constituency at the elections to the European Parliament. He lost his seat at the 1997 general election to the Independent Fianna Fáil candidate Harry Blaney, and unsuccessfully contested the 1997 elections to Seanad Éireann on the Industrial and Commercial Panel. After this, he retired from politics.

Post-retirement
After his retirement he was involved in a number of projects, including (along with Glenn Barr) the Messines Island of Ireland Peace Park in West Flanders in Belgium. This park was officially opened in November 1998 by President Mary McAleese, Queen Elizabeth II and King Albert II of Belgium to commemorate all Irishmen who died in World War I.

Harte died the morning of 8 January 2018 at the age of 86.

Awards
He was appointed an Honorary OBE in October 2006 for his ecumenical works. He received an honorary Doctorate of Laws from the National University of Ireland in September 2007 in recognition of his contribution to politics.

Reading
Paddy Harte, Young Tigers and Mongrel Foxes: A life in politics, The O'Brien Press, Dublin, 2005.

References

 

1931 births
2018 deaths
Fine Gael TDs
Local councillors in County Donegal
Honorary Officers of the Order of the British Empire
Members of the 17th Dáil
Members of the 18th Dáil
Members of the 19th Dáil
Members of the 20th Dáil
Members of the 21st Dáil
Members of the 22nd Dáil
Members of the 23rd Dáil
Members of the 24th Dáil
Members of the 25th Dáil
Members of the 26th Dáil
Members of the 27th Dáil
People educated at St Eunan's College
People from Lifford
Irish farmers
Ministers of State of the 22nd Dáil